Knowre is an education technology company founded in Seoul and headquartered in New York City.

Pilot Program
Knowre launched a nationwide campaign with schools to pilot its online adaptive math program for Pre-Algebra and Algebra I in 2013.

Features

History
 2008 Knowre was born out of a math academy in Gangnam, Seoul, South Korea.
 December 2012 Knowre raises a $1.4 million investment from SoftBank Ventures Korea (“SBVK”).
 February 2013 Knowre releases its first curriculum, Algebra I, in a public open beta.
 August 2013 Knowre launches its Nationwide Pilot Program across 34 cities and 17 states in USA and Canada. Knowre also releases product updates including the new Pre-Algebra curriculum, Teacher's Dashboard (premium feature; only available to pilot schools), and the gamified quest and achievement systems.

Awards and recognition 
In 2012, Knowre was awarded the grand prize at Global K-Startup, a competition sponsored by Google, the Korean Internet & Security Agency, and the Korea Communications Commission.
Knowre was called one of four “South Korean Startups to Watch.”

In May 2013, Knowre won first place in the GapApp Challenge sponsored by the New York City Department of Education.

In 2014, Knowre opened its headquarters in New York and launched an app version for the United States.

Notes

Educational software
Virtual learning environments
Software companies based in New York (state)
Software companies of the United States